Brant Boyer (born June 27, 1971) is a former American football linebacker and coach who is the special teams coordinator for the New York Jets of the National Football League (NFL).  He was selected by the Jacksonville Jaguars in the 1995 NFL Expansion Draft. After five productive seasons with the Jaguars, Boyer spent three seasons as a member of the Cleveland Browns. He is currently the special teams coach for the New York Jets. Previously he was the assistant special teams coach for the Indianapolis Colts. Brant's father Craig also was a skilled football player. Brant went to High School at North Summit in Coalville. Also before attending Arizona he went to Weber State.

Coaching career

Colts
From 2012 to 2015 Boyer worked with the Indianapolis Colts special teams. There he worked with all pros Pat McAfee and Adam Vinatieri.

Jets
In 2016 Boyer was named the Jets special teams coordinator.
In 2021, despite the Jets 4-13 record, Boyer's Special Teams Squad ranked #2 in the NFL according to DVAO ref. Rankingshttps://www.footballoutsiders.com/stats/nfl/special-teams/2021/regular

References

1971 births
Living people
American football linebackers
Miami Dolphins players
Jacksonville Jaguars players
Cleveland Browns players
Arizona Wildcats football players
New York Jets coaches